Zhao Wei (born 12 March 1976), also known as Vicky Zhao or Vicki Zhao, is a Chinese actress, businesswoman, film director, producer and pop singer. She is considered one of the most popular actresses in China and Chinese-speaking regions, and one of the highest paid actresses as well.

While studying at the Beijing Film Academy, Zhao rose to national and regional prominence overnight for her role as Xiao Yan Zi ("Little Swallow") in the hit TV series My Fair Princess (1998–1999), for which she also won Golden Eagle Award for Best Actress. My Fair Princess enjoyed unprecedented success in East and Southeast Asian countries, and Zhao was regarded by many as Mainland China's first "national idol" since the economic reform began in 1978.

Zhao has starred in many box-office hits, including Shaolin Soccer (2001), Red Cliff (2008–2009), Painted Skin (2008), Painted Skin: The Resurrection (2012), Dearest (2014) and Lost in Hong Kong (2015). She has received numerous awards from the Shanghai International Film Festival, Huabiao Awards, Changchun Film Festival, Hundred Flowers Awards and Shanghai Film Critics Awards for films like A Time to Love (2005) and Mulan (2009). In 2014, after almost a two-year break from acting, she appeared in Peter Chan's film Dearest, and won the Hong Kong Film Critics Society Award and Hong Kong Film Award for Best Actress.

While focusing mostly on films, her works also include TV series such as Romance in the Rain (2001), Moment in Peking (2005) and Tiger Mom (2015). She has a music career, starting with her debut album Swallow (1999), and has released 7 albums. In 2006, she won the MTV Asia Award for Favorite Artist from Mainland China, for her album Double.

Zhao ranked 80th on Forbes China Celebrity 100 list in 2013, 22nd in 2014, 7th in 2015, and 28th in 2017. In 2016, Zhao is named as member of the main jury at the 73rd Venice International Film Festival. In September 2017, she is named as a member of the main competition jury for the 30th Tokyo International Film Festival.

Zhao received her master's degree in film directing from Beijing Film Academy in 2012. Her directorial debut So Young (2013) is both a box office and critical success. It broke the box office record for films directed by female Chinese directors in a week, and eventually became one of the highest-grossing films in China. The movie earned her multiple awards in mainland China, Hong Kong and Taiwan, including Golden Rooster Award for Best Directorial Debut, Hundred Flowers Award for Best Director and Hong Kong Film Award for Best Film from Mainland and Taiwan.

On 27 August 2021, all films and television dramas featuring Zhao disappeared from Chinese video streaming services like Tencent Video and iQiyi, and her Weibo Super Talk was deleted; no formal explanation was given by the Chinese government.

Early life
Born and brought up in Wuhu, Anhui, Zhao is the second child to Zhao Jiahai, an engineer, and Wei Qiying, a primary school teacher, She has an elder brother Zhao Jian (born 1971). After secondary school, Zhao entered Wuhu Normal School, a local education institution training students to become pre-school teachers. She also received training in piano, dance, and Chinese ink wash painting.

Career

Early career (1994–1997)
In 1993, while Zhao was still in school, the movie A Soul Haunted by Painting (1994), directed by Huang Shuqin, starring Gong Li and Derek Yee, was filming in Wuhu. Zhao was cast in the role of a young prostitute in the brothel where Gong's character worked, her first acting experience. She appeared briefly at the beginning of the film and had no dialogue.

Zhao developed a strong interest in acting after this first experience, and decided to become an actress. In 1994, after graduating from the Wuhu Normal School, she gave up her job as an apprentice pre-school teacher. She moved from her hometown to Shanghai and enrolled in Xie Jin Star Academy, an acting school founded by the Chinese director Xie Jin, where she received structured acting training during 1994–1995. She was also selected by Xie to star in his movie Penitentiary Angel (1996). This was her first substantial role. Though she did not find her own performance fulfilling, Zhao considered it a valuable experience and a good start to her career. The film landed her other roles in TV series including her first leading role in Sisters in Beijing (1996). "I am too young to understand the role," she said, "but if you've been cast in a film by a famous director, no matter how well you did, other less-famous directors will also want to cast you."

In 1996, Zhao was admitted to the Beijing Film Academy (BFA) School of Performing Arts with the highest entrance examination score nation-wide. She graduated four years later with a Bachelor’s Degree in performing arts as one of the most outstanding graduates – Zhao scored five "A"s and nine "A−"s out of the 14 courses. Her graduation thesis scored 90 (out of 100).

Rise to Stardom (1998–2001)
In 1997, novelist and producer Chiung Yao was casting the TV series My Fair Princess, a joint production by mainland China and Taiwan which was adapted from Chiung Yao's own novel. She identified Zhao Wei as a talent after watching Sisters in Beijing and offered Zhao the title role of Huan Zhu Ge Ge (Princess Pearl) a.k.a. Xiao Yanzi ("Little Swallow"), a rebellious and funny princess who dared to challenge authority and rules in the palace. Filming the series was an arduous task for Zhao and her co-stars; Zhao herself acknowledged the intensity of filming: 

The hard work of the cast yielded unexpected results. This comedic period drama quickly became a phenomenal sensation and swept TV ratings in Taiwan, mainland China, Hong Kong and Southeast Asian countries such as Singapore and Vietnam. Zhao rose to prominence and became a household name overnight. In 1999, she became the youngest actress to win the Golden Eagle Award for Best Actress. She is regarded by many as mainland China's first "national idol", and was named one of Taiwan's "Top Ten Most Outstanding Individuals in Television". She is also regarded as one of China's Four Dan Actresses. However, alongside the phenomenal success were increasingly negative critics in mainland China, attacking the rebellious role as a "bad influence" over children. During the Chinese People's Political Consultative Conference in 2002, a member of the CPPCC submit a proposal to boycott the "little swallow". 
Zhao once again worked with Chiung Yao for the 2001 television series Romance in the Rain, a costume drama set in the 1930s and 1940s. In this series, Zhao played a vengeful girl who tried to exact revenge against her parents. The series was a commercial success, and recorded the highest ratings of the year.

Zhao soon felt that she had achieved all she could in television and began to shift her career focus from TV to films.

Film (2001–2008)
Zhao went on to star in a few Hong Kong movies. In 2001, she starred in the comedy film Shaolin Soccer alongside Hong Kong actor and director Stephen Chow. Zhao played an ugly-duckling steamed bun-maker-cum-taichi-master, a great contrast from the glamorous image she had established for herself in previous roles. Zhao was nominated at the Chinese Film Media Awards for Best Actress. This was followed by a supporting role in Chinese Odyssey 2002 as "Phoenix", for which she was nominated Golden Horse Award for Best Supporting Actress. In 2002, Zhao played an assassin in So Close, which also stars Shu Qi and Karen Mok.

In 2003, Zhao starred in four films: My Dream Girl, Warriors of Heaven and Earth, Green Tea, and Jade Goddess of Mercy. After much speculation over who was cast for the female lead An Xin in Ann Hui's film Jade Goddess of Mercy, the role was finally offered to Zhao, and her performance was well received by critics. In 2004, the Chinese Association of Film Performing Arts presented her the Golden Phoenix Award for this role. She was also nominated at the 27th Hundred Flowers Award for Best Actress for her performance in Warriors of Heaven and Earth.

In 2004, Zhao was cast to dub the character Princess Fiona for when Shrek 2 was released in China.

The year 2005 proved to be another successful year for Zhao. She won the Golden Goblet Award for Best Actress at the Shanghai International Film Festival and tied with Zhang Ziyi for the Huabiao Award. Both awards were for her performance in A Time to Love. Zhao once again won Best Actress for the film at the 8th Changchun Film Festival in 2006.

After a four-year break from television series, Zhao starred as Yao Mulan in a remake of Lin Yutang's Moment in Peking (2005). The television series became Zhao's fourth TV drama (after My Fair Princess, My Fair Princess 2 and Romance in the Rain) to become the highest rated drama of the year. Zhao was nominated at the 26th Flying Apsaras Awards for Outstanding Actress.

Following the success of Moment in Peking, Zhao starred in The Postmodern Life of My Aunt, which premiered at film festivals around the world, including the Toronto International Film Festival. Though Zhao only appeared for ten minutes in the film, her performance led her to be nominated at the 43rd Golden Horse Awards and the 27th Hong Kong Film Awards for Best Supporting Actress.

In 2006, Zhao made a surprising move by sitting for the national entrance exam for postgraduate studies. After passing, Zhao returned to her alma mater, the Beijing Film Academy (BFA) in September 2006 as a postgraduate student in the Department of Film Directing, where she studied under director Tian Zhuangzhuang. That year, Zhao was ranked No.4 on Forbes 2006 China Celebrity 100 list. She was selected as the "Most Beautiful Woman" in China through a national vote by Sina.com & Sohu.com's users. People magazine also listed Zhao as "100 Most Beautiful People" in 2006.

Zhao then portrayed a cabby in the 2007 film The Longest Night in Shanghai, starring alongside Masahiro Motoki and Dylan Kuo. The same year, Zhao starred in the television series Thank You for Having Loved Me. She reportedly received a salary of 100,000 yuan per episode.

Kung Fu epics (2008–2010)
From 2008 to 2009, Zhao starred in John Woo's historical epic Red Cliff. Set in the Three Kingdoms period, the film is mainland China's most expensive production then. She played Sun Shangxiang, the independent-minded sister of warlord Sun Quan, who disguises herself as a male enemy soldier to gather intelligence. Zhao received two nominations at the Hong Kong Film Award for Best Supporting Actress.

She next appeared in Gordon Chan's horror-adventure film Painted Skin (2008). The film set a new milestone in Chinese film by grossing 100 million yuan in six days. Zhao's role as a general's wife was particularly acclaimed, and she received Best Actress nominations at the 27th Golden Rooster Award and 3rd Asian Film Award.

In 2009, Zhao played the legendary character Hua Mulan in Jingle Ma's Mulan.
Ma called Zhao the "perfect fit" for the cross-dressing heroine. Zhao won the Best Actress Award at the 10th Changchun Film Festival, 30th Hundred Flowers Awards and 19th Shanghai Film Critics Awards for her performance in the film.

On 6 August 2009, she was elected vice-president of the China Film Performance Art Academy and executive member of the council of the China Environmental Society.

After filming the wuxia film 14 Blades alongside Donnie Yen, Starting in mid-2010 Zhao took a 2-year break from acting. On 11 April 2010, she gave birth to a girl, Huang Xin, the only child of her and businessman Huang Youlong, whom she married in 2008.

In June 2010, she returned to  the limelight as a jury member of the 13th Shanghai International Film Festival.

Comeback and directing (2012–)

Zhao returned from her extended parental leave in 2012, playing, incidentally, a single mother in Love, directed by Doze Niu. The film also achieved commercial success, and became the only film to gross 100 million yuan in both Taiwan and mainland China. Critics call the solo performance of Zhao Wei as "the most amazing scene". The same year she starred in Painted Skin: The Resurrection, the sequel to the 2008 film Painted Skin. The film grossed over 700 million yuan to become the highest grossing Chinese film then, before being beaten by Lost in Thailand.

In 2012, she graduated from the directing institute of Beijing Film Academy, with an MFA dissertation defense score of 99/100, ranking No. 1 out of all the graduates.

Her directorial debut, So Young, opened on 26 April 2013 to 141 million yuan in its first weekend. She is the first female director whose debut film broke 100 million yuan in China. In just one week, So Young garnered 350 million yuan, with the final box office record in China being over 700 million yuan. For the film, Zhao won the Golden Rooster Award for Best Directorial Debut, Hundred Flowers Award for Best Director and Hong Kong Film Award for Best Film from Mainland and Taiwan.

Zhao also became a judge for the 5th season of China's Got Talent alongside Liu Ye, Alec Su and Wang Wei Chun.

Zhao returned to acting in 2014, playing a countrywoman in the film Dearest, directed by Peter Chan. The movie was selected by the 71st Venice International Film Festival in the Out-of-competition category, and Zhao's performance as a foster mother of a kidnapped children received international acclaim. The Hollywood Reporter called her Chinese Juliette Binoche. This movie also earned Zhao the Hong Kong Film Award and Hong Kong Film Critics Society Award for Best Actress.

In 2015, she starred in comedies Hollywood Adventures and Lost in Hong Kong, both of which were commercially successful. Forbes described Zhao as the "world's wealthiest working actress". The same year, Zhao made her return to television in Tiger Mom. She was nominated at the Asian Television Award and Magnolia Award for Best Actress in a Television Series. On 20 October, Zhao elected as executive member of Executive Committee of China Film Directors' Guild.

In 2016, Zhao played a doctor in Johnnie To's crime thriller film Three. She also began the production for her second directorial work No Other Love. In July, she was a member of the main competition jury for the 73rd Venice International Film Festival.

In February 2017, Zhao went back to her alma mater – School of Performing Arts, Beijing Film Academy – to be the finale round examiner/assessor of applicants for the 2017 intake. The entrance exam is said to be the most challenging one for students pursuing performing arts whereby the success ratio is 1:113. In September, she was named as a member of the main competition jury for the 30th Tokyo International Film Festival.

In March 2018, Zhao Wei was a member of the finale-round jury for the 9th China Film Directors Guild Award. She was also appointed as official spokesperson of the 12th Xining FIRST International Film Festival. On 17 Oct, CCTV announced Zhao as the chief director of the documentary Starlight, presented by China Movie Channel.

As the protagonist Catherine, Zhao made her stage debut with a public theater production adapted from David Auburn's 2001 broadway play Proof, directed by Tian Zhuangzhuang. The play opened in Beijing at the Tianqiao Art Center on 23 January 2019 to critical acclaim.

By 2021, Zhao had been "erased" from the internet in China without official reasons.

Other work
Alongside her acting career, Zhao has become actively involved in commercial work. In 2001, she was selected as one of "China's Top Ten Most Popular Commercial Models", the culmination of her work for Red Earth and Amoisonic Mobile Phone. The same year, Zhao was ranked second on "China's Top 10 Artists for Advertisements" list. South Korean television network KBS ranked Zhao number one in China and Japan and number two in South Korea, crowning her "Commercial Queen in 3 countries".

On several occasions, Zhao has been praised by the media for her sense of style. At the Lycra Channel Young Awards (now known as the China Fashion Awards), Zhao was chosen as the "Most Stylish Actress" in mainland China. The same year, MTV China also selected Zhao as the "Most Stylish Asian Actress". Zhao received another fashion award at the 2004 Pierre Cardin Awards. In 2005 Zhao was awarded the "Most Stylish Female Artist" and "Most Stylish Actor" at the China Fashion Award (CFA). In 2007, Zhao won her third "Most Stylish Actor" at the China Fashion Awards. The same year, she won "Most Stylish Female Artist" at the MTV China Style Gala.

As of 18 April 2011, Zhao was climbing up the ranks of the most followed microbloggers worldwide. Her fan count exceeded six million, bringing her closer to American celebrities Ellen DeGeneres, Ashton Kutcher and Katy Perry, all of whom have also passed the six million fan mark.

Media investments
Wei and her husband purchased stakes in Alibaba Pictures in 2014, leading to tens of millions of dollars in gains over the next two years.

Although the acquiring company have answered the Shanghai Stock Exchange questions, several mainland China media and some netizens still boycott it, regard the buyout by a female actor as "the hen cackles in the morning". Furthermore, nationalists combined with ultra-left media attack Zhao continuously. Finally, original banks quit for "uncertainty", causing the acquisition to fail.

Wine interests
Zhao is a wine lover and has developed a passion for winemaking. On 21 December 2011, she finalised the purchase of  the Château Monlot, a Saint-Émilion Grand Cru vineyard in France, for €4 million. On 16 September 2012, Zhao was admitted into the Jurade de Saint-Émilion. Following four years of work, Zhao launched the Bordeaux wine brand in the Chinese mass market in October 2015. The online shop offers both high end and affordable wine selections.
Since her purchase of Château Monlot she has expanded her wine interests in France by purchasing the 9 hectare Patarabet vineyard in AOC Saint-Émilion, the 57 hectare Senailhac vineyard in Entre-Deux-Mers and on 29 March 2019 the 12 hectare Château La Croix de la Roche vineyard in AOC Fronsac and Bordeaux. The Château La Croix de la Roche has an annual potential production of 82,000 bottles and is Zhao's first certified organic property. It was purchased from Isabelle Maurin, who had owned the château since 1982, and sold it due to lack of a family member willing to take over the property.

Personal life
After two known relationships, Zhao Wei married Chinese businessman Huang You Long in 2008 in Singapore. The couple's daughter, Huang Xing is born in April 2010.

Zhao is close friend with Chinese singers Faye Wong and Na Ying.

Philanthropy
Zhao has been actively involved in charity and disaster relief work. Her notable charity work and donations include:

In 1999, Zhao donated 100,000 yuan, after the Taiwan 921 earthquake.
In 2004, with the local education authority, she set up a scholarship and study grant fund in Wuhu, her hometown. for students from families in financial difficulties.
In 2005, she was appointed as a spokesperson and ambassador for the United Nations Children's Fund and China Youth Concern Committee's "Awareness for Children Affected by AIDS" campaign; she also performed the song "来得及的明天" as the theme song for the campaign. 
In 2006, Zhao supported fundraising events for the Smile Angel Foundation, a charity fund set up by Zhao's friend, pop diva Faye Wong, for children with clefts.
The morning following the 2008 Sichuan earthquake, Zhao donated 100,000 yuan to the China Red Cross.<ref>{{cite web|title=红十字会搜狐发救灾倡议 赵薇积极响应捐款10万|url=http://yule.sohu.com/20080513/n256824369.shtml|date=13 May 2008|work=Sohu|language=zh}}</ref> Soon afterward, she donated 500,000 yuan to the China Children and Teenagers' Fund to construct a Spring Bude Building School.
On 29 March 2010, Zhao donated 200,000 RMB to the Yunnan government, as Yunnan was suffering from the worst drought during the past few decades. On 17 April, the third day after the Qinghai Yushu Earthquake, Zhao donated 200,000 yuan to the China Foundation for Poverty Alleviation. 
 In 2011 Zhao received the China Charity Billboard Award for her contributions to charity. 
On 22 April 2013, Zhao donated 500,000 RMB to the Sichuan Yaan Earthquake.
In 2014, Zhao launched the V-Love Foundation for childhood leukemia. Also in 2014, Zhao was named ambassador for the Global Alliance for Clean Cookstoves. 
In June 2016, Zhao donated 1 million RMB to the Anhui government, as Anhui was suffering from the worst flooding during the past decade. The same year, Zhao was appointed ambassador for China Soong Ching Ling Foundation and the United Nations Development Programme's (UNDP) "Ethnic Minority Women Empowerment and Development Project", aimed to promote sustainable human development with ethnic minority women through joint collaborations in social and economic development. She was also named the ambassador for an Anti Child-trafficking campaign by the Chinese Ministry of Public Security. On 20 November, UNDP appointed her as goodwill ambassador. On 26 December, Zhao held a charity party for her V-Love Foundation and raised donations more than 16 million yuan for childhood leukemia.
In July 2017, Zhao and her husband donated 1 million HKD to the Hunan government, as Hunan was suffering from flooding.

Controversy
Zhao has been a regular subject of tabloids. In 2001, she did a group of photos for the August issue of fashion magazine L'Officiel China. In one photo, Zhao was wearing a designer dress (Heatherette NYC label, designed by Richie Rich). The dress assembled a pattern similar to the Japanese military's Rising Sun Flag during World War 2 (WW II). Four months later, in December 2001, a local evening newspaper started to question and criticize the photo. Still torn by Japan's crimes against China during WW II, the newspaper quickly provoked a public outcry, and more media joined to attack Zhao. Some called for her work to be banned and to prohibit her from show business. On 9 December, the newspaper Beijing Evening News and network Sina.com published Zhao's apology letter to the nation. On 17 December, Zhao again apologized on the television show Entertainment Live; the apology was broadcast on 200 television networks and 100 radio stations in China.

Different opinions and questions started to surface over the magazine editors' negligence and choice of dress. There were also suspicions that the incident was a set-up to ruin Zhao's career. On 28 December 2001, during her performance at a concert, Zhao was attacked on stage by Fu Shenghua, a construction worker who later said his grandparents were killed during the Second Sino-Japanese War. Reflecting upon his actions, Fu told a Chinese magazine: "I know what I did isn't right. But I believe my cause is just... As a famous Chinese person, she should have been aware of such an important event in Chinese history." Later, a Chinese newspaper, Beijing Youth Daily published a special report after a two-month investigation and alleged that Fu had lied to the media, claiming that no one in his family had died during the war and that he was not a construction worker but instead had been unemployed for several years. The journalist noted that it was difficult to have conversations with Fu due to his alleged extremist views. More and more people started to believe that the incident was a set-up and the public views started becoming more sympathetic to Zhao. After this report was published, the hype surrounding the incident died down and the Chinese media seldom mentioned it again.

In July 2004, Zhao was embroiled in further controversy when a woman named Zou Xue accused Zhao of assaulting her in a restaurant over a business dispute. Zhao and Zou had been business partners, and opened a bar together in Beijing. Zou claimed that Zhao had instructed her chauffeur to hit Zou after a business dispute. Zou filed a lawsuit demanding compensation as well as a public apology. Zhao denied hitting Zou, but much of the public was not on Zhao's side. However, the incident quickly had a dramatic twist when a media investigation found that Zou's medical report was fake, and was produced by a hospital managed by family members. The court then rejected Zou's lawsuit against Zhao. In addition, people found that Zou was the L'Officiel editor who stepped down due to the "Japanese flag" incident. Many were convinced that the "Japanese flag" incident was a set-up and Zou was somehow involved. Zhao regained some public support.

Zhao completed her second directorial feature No Other Love in June 2016. On 1 July 2016, the Communist Youth League used its own website and social media to criticize Zhao over the male cast and Taiwanese director-actor Leon Dai's alleged support for Taiwanese independence. Its posting on Weibo called for a boycott of the movie. Following the call, China's nationalists and nationalist unions started to attack Zhao for being a "public enemy" and "traitor" to the nation. The nationalists also branded Zhao as an "American spy", citing  that she had taken a photo and shaken hands with Hillary Clinton at the Global Alliance for Clean Cookstoves Future Summit in Manhattan, US on 20 November 2014. In early July, both Dai, Zhao and their movie production studios issued apology statements but the nationalists continued to attack them. On 15 July 2016, under online assault, Zhao apologized, and the movie studio also announced its plan to replace Dai. The incident generated much debate online, and some famous Chinese writers, professors and filmmakers, including Fang Fang, Sai Ren, Shi Hang, Yan Feng, He Ping, Chen Guoxing, along with People's Daily's social media and China Newsweek (present by China News Service) categorically denounced the online abuse and/or voiced their support for Zhao.

In November 2018, the Shanghai Stock Exchange banned Zhao and her husband from company boards for five years due to a failed bid to buy a 29.1% stake of the mobile company Zhejiang Wanjia by Tibet Longwei, a company they controlled, in 2016. It was stated that they made the bid lacking financial resources and that their bid disrupted the market order.

On 27 August 2021, all films and television dramas featuring Zhao disappeared from Chinese video streaming services like Tencent Video and iQiyi, and her Weibo Super Talk was deleted (while the Weibo accounts of her own and her studio remain normal). No explanation was given by the Chinese government,.

On 28 August 2021, Zhao was reported to have left China for France, reportedly being spotted at an airport in Bordeaux that day. In a now-deleted Instagram post from 29 August, Zhao claimed she was in Beijing, denying that she was in France. In September 2021 it was reported that Wei was seen in her hometown, Wuhu.

Filmography

 1994:   A Soul Haunted by Painting (Cameo)
 1994:   Penitentiary Angel
 1996:   East Palace West Palace
 1996:   Sisters in Beijing (TV)
 1996:   Yutian Has a Story (TV)
 1997:   Da Mo Fang Magic Formula (TV)
 1998: My Fair Princess Season 1 (TV)
 1998:   Records of Kangxi's Travel Incognito Season 2 (TV)
 1998:   Old House Has Joy (TV)
 1999:   Deja Vu 2000
 1999:   My Fair Princess Season 2 (TV)
 2000:   Assassin Swordsman
 2000:   The Duel (2000 film)
 2000: Treasure Venture (TV series)
 2001: Shaolin Soccer 2001: Romance in the Rain (TV)
 2002: So Close 2002:   Chinese Odyssey 2002
 2003: Warriors of Heaven and Earth 2003:   My Dream Girl
 2003:   Green Tea (film)
 2003:   Jade Goddess of Mercy
 2005: A Time to Love 
 2005: Moment in Peking (TV)
 2006:   Postmodern Life of My Aunt
 2006:   Fast Track Love (TV)
 2007:   Thank You For Having Loved Me (TV)
 2007:   The Longest Night in Shanghai
 2008: Red Cliff 2008: Painted Skin 2009:   Red Cliff (film)(Part 2)
 2009: Mulan 2009:   The Founding of a Republic (Cameo)
 2009:   The Epic of a Woman (TV)
 2010: 14 Blades 2012: Love (2012 film) 2012: Painted Skin: The Resurrection 2013: So Young (as director)
 2014: Dearest 2015:   12 Golden Ducks (Cameo)
 2015: Hollywood Adventures 2015: Lost in Hong Kong 
 2015: Tiger Mom (TV)
 2016: Three 2017:   Chinese Restaurant (TV series) Season 1 (TV)
 2018:   Chinese Restaurant (TV series) Season 2 (TV)
 2019: Two Tigers 2021: Crazy FistDiscography

 1999: Swallow (小燕子)
 1999: Magic of Love (爱情大魔咒)
 2001: The Last Separation (最后一次分手)
 2004: Afloat (飘)
 2005: Double (双)
 2007: Angel's Suitcase (天使旅行箱)
 2009: We're All Great Directors''

Ambassadorship
2001 World University Games
2002 China Youth Development Foundation "Hope Project"
2002 All-China Environment Federation
2004 China Farmers Games
2005 United Nations Children's Fund's "Orphan and Vulnerable Children, Children Affected by AIDS Awareness"
2007 World Special Olympic Games
2007 China Foundation of Disabled Person "Lighting Activities"
2008 China Red Cross "Heart Project"
2009 China Flowers Expo
2010 Changchun Film Festival
2011 Golden Rooster and Hundred Flowers Film Festival
2013 Festival du Cinéma Chinois en France 
2014 China Sport Show 
2014 United Nations Foundation's Global Alliance for Clean Cookstoves 
2016 The Ministry of Public Security of China's Anti-kidnapping 
2016 United Nations Development Programme's Goodwill Ambassador
2018 Xining FIRST International Film Festival
2019 Festival Croisements

Endorsements 
From 2013 to 2014, Zhao was the spokeswoman of Samsung Galaxy Note 3. From 2012 to 2017, Zhao was the official ambassador of Jaeger-LeCoultre. Since 2018, Zhao has been selected as the official brand ambassador of Burberry. Since 2020, Italian luxury brand Fendi has announced that Zhao will serve as the brand's spokesperson in China.

Awards and nominations

Forbes China Celebrity 100

References

External links
Zhao Wei's official Weibo
Zhao Wei's blog at Sohu

1976 births
Living people
20th-century Chinese actresses
21st-century Chinese actresses
21st-century Chinese businesswomen
21st-century Chinese businesspeople
21st-century Chinese women singers
Actresses from Anhui
Beijing Film Academy alumni
Businesspeople from Anhui
Chinese film actresses
Chinese television actresses
Chinese Mandopop singers
Chinese women film directors
Chinese women film producers
People from Wuhu
People's Republic of China Buddhists
Singers from Anhui